Kokoba Town is an album by the Zimbabwean music and dance group Siyaya.

Track listing
 "KokobaTown" (M. Sobiko / S.M. Phiri) - 3:15
 "Igqhiha" (Manhattan Brothers / Siyaya) - 3:25
 "Ngizobuya" (S.M. Phiri) - 6:41
 "Malukazana" (R. Kasawaya / Siyaya) - 3:45
 "The Story" (R. Masuku / Z. Dube / T. Gumede / S.M. Phiri) - 6:22
 "Makhelwane" (T. Moyo / S.M. Phiri / Siyaya) - 3:52
 "Ndavhunza" (R. Masuku / R. Kasawaya / S.M. Phiri) - 4:38
 "We Baba" (S.M. Phiri / Siyaya) - 3:37
 "New Creation" (Siyaya) - 2:51
 "Baleka" (Siyaya) - 6:29
 "I went away...." (R. Masuku / S.M. Phiri) - 2:00
 "Abekho" (S.M. Phiri / Siyaya) - 3:58
 "Siyajabula" (Siyaya) - 2:52
 "Junior" (M. Sobiko / Siyaya) - 5:12

2002 albums